Costello Tagliapietra is a fashion house, established in New York City, founded and directed by Jeffrey Costello (born in Bristol, Pennsylvania) and Robert Tagliapietra (born in Pleasantville, New York).

History
Costello and Tagliapietra met in Manhattan in 1994, and after eleven years working together they presented their first collection for the spring 2005 season at New York Fashion Week, and won the 2005 Ecco Domani Fashion Foundation Award.

From its inception, Costello Tagliapietra has had a prêt-à-porter clothing line for women.

Designers
Jeffrey Costello
Robert Tagliapietra

Retail outlets
The brand has stores in USA, Belgium, France, Germany, Lebanon, Russia, Saudi Arabia and Turkey.

References

External links
Official Site

High fashion brands